River Radamus (born February 12, 1998) is an American World Cup alpine ski racer from Colorado. He is a three-time Youth Olympic Games gold medalist and a two-time World Junior Champion. At the World Cup level, Radamus is a three-event skier, competing in slalom, giant slalom, and super G. He is the son of Aldo Radamus, former U.S. Ski Team coach and Ski Club Vail director.

Radamus represented the United States at the 2022 Winter Olympics, and just missed a medal, finishing fourth in the giant slalom.

World Cup results

Season standings

Top ten finishes

0 podiums; 4 top tens (4 GS)

World Championship results

Olympic results

References

External links

River Radamus at U.S. Ski & Snowboard

1998 births
Living people
American male alpine skiers
Sportspeople from Colorado
Alpine skiers at the 2016 Winter Youth Olympics
Youth Olympic gold medalists for the United States
Alpine skiers at the 2022 Winter Olympics
Olympic alpine skiers of the United States